Solar viewer (also known as solar viewing glasses or solar eclipse glasses) are special eyewear designed for direct viewing of the Sun. Standard sunglasses are unable to filter out eye damaging radiation. Solar viewers are required for safe viewing of solar events such as eclipses. The recommended optical density of this eyewear is 5.

Safety
According to the American Astronomical Society (AAS) products meeting the ISO 12312-2 standard avoids risk damage, and issued a list of reputable vendors of eclipse glasses. The organization warned against products claiming ISO certification, or even citing the exact standard number, but not tested by an accredited laboratory, or those bearing incomplete certification information. Another problem was counterfeits of reputable vendors' products, some even claiming the company's name (such as with American Paper Optics which published information detailing the differences between its glasses and counterfeits).

Eyewear made prior to 2015, may have a 3-year use limit before they can no longer effectively filter out UV radiation. Starting in 2015, products made with ISO 12312-2 can be used indefinitely as long as they have not been damaged by scratch or tear.

Counterfeit eclipse glasses
In the months leading to the solar eclipse of August 21, 2017, counterfeits of light-filtering glasses for solar eclipses began proliferating, leading to public health issues. Effective eclipse glasses filter visible, ultraviolet, and infrared light. The eye's retina lacks pain receptors, and thus damage could occur without one's awareness.

The AAS said determining whether an eclipse viewer was safe required a spectrophotometer and lab equipment, but often the user should see nothing through the filter except for the Sun, sunlight reflecting off of shiny metal, or intense light sources such as an LED flashlight.

Andrew Lund, the owner of a vendor of eclipse glasses, noted that not all counterfeit glasses were necessarily unsafe.  He stated to Quartz that the counterfeits he tested blocked the majority of harmful light, concluding that "the IP is getting ripped off, but the good news is there are no long-term harmful effects."

On July 27, 2017, Amazon required all eclipse viewing products sold on its website have a submission of origin and safety information, and proof of an accredited ISO certification. In mid-August 2017, Amazon recalled and pulled listings for eclipse viewing glasses that "may not comply with industry standards", and gave refunds to customers who had purchased them.

See also
 Astronomical solar filter
 Eclipse chasing
 Solar telescope
 Transit of Mercury
 Transit of Venus

References

Eyewear
Ophthalmology
Prevention
Fashion accessories
Solar viewing glasses
2010s fashion